In solid-state physics, the Landau–Lifshitz equation (LLE), named for Lev Landau and Evgeny Lifshitz, is a partial differential equation describing time evolution of magnetism in solids, depending on 1 time variable and  1, 2, or 3 space variables.

Landau–Lifshitz equation
The LLE describes an anisotropic magnet. The equation  depends on a fixed symmetric 3 by 3 matrix J, usually assumed to be diagonal; that is, . It is given by Hamilton's equation of motion for the Hamiltonian

(where J(S) is the quadratic form of J applied to the vector S)
which is

In 1+1 dimensions this equation is

In 2+1 dimensions this equation takes the form

which is the (2+1)-dimensional LLE. For the (3+1)-dimensional case LLE looks like

Integrable reductions
In general case LLE  (2) is nonintegrable. But it admits the two integrable reductions:
 a) in the 1+1 dimensions, that is Eq. (3), it is integrable
 b) when . In this case the (1+1)-dimensional LLE (3) turns into the continuous classical Heisenberg ferromagnet equation (see e.g. Heisenberg model (classical)) which is already integrable.

See also
 Nonlinear Schrödinger equation
 Heisenberg model (classical)
 Spin wave
 Micromagnetism
 Ishimori equation
 Magnet
 Ferromagnetism

References

 Kosevich A.M., Ivanov B.A., Kovalev A.S. Nonlinear magnetization waves. Dynamical and topological solitons. – Kiev: Naukova Dumka, 1988. – 192 p.

Magnetic ordering
Partial differential equations
Lev Landau